

Works
 Fujiwara no Teika, editor, Ogura Hyakunin Isshu, an anthology of 100 Japanese poems, each by a different poet; is compiled about this year; the popularity of the anthology has endured to the present day, and a Japanese card game, Uta-garuta, uses cards with the poems printed on it

Births
 Guittone d'Arezzo (died 1294), founder of the Tuscan School

Deaths
 Ibn al-Farid (born 1184), Arabic Sufi poet

Events

13th-century poetry
Poetry